Elizabeth Mabel Church (born 11 March 1930) is a female British former swimmer.

Swimming career
Church competed in the women's 200 metre breaststroke at the 1948 Summer Olympics. She represented England and won a silver medal in the 330 yard Medley Relay and a bronze medal in the 220 yard Breaststroke at the 1950 British Empire Games in Auckland, New Zealand. At the ASA National British Championships she won the 220 yards breaststroke title in 1947 and 1948.

References

1930 births
Living people
British female swimmers
Olympic swimmers of Great Britain
Swimmers at the 1948 Summer Olympics
People from Marylebone
Sportspeople from London
Swimmers at the 1950 British Empire Games
Commonwealth Games medallists in swimming
Commonwealth Games silver medallists for England
Commonwealth Games bronze medallists for England
20th-century British women
Medallists at the 1950 British Empire Games